The 2015–16 Treća HNL season is the 25th since its establishment. The first matches of the season will be played on 22 August 2015, and the season will end on 4 June 2016.

Overview before the season
50 teams will join the league, including one relegated from the 2014–15 Druga HNL and six promoted from the lower leagues.

Relegated from 2014–15 Druga HNL
Pomorac (Druga HNL→club is dissolved)
Bistra (Druga HNL→Unified League of Zagreb County)
Promoted from 2014–15 Inter-county leagues and County leagues

Marsonia (Inter-county league of East→Treća HNL East)
Krk (Inter-county league of Rijeka→Treća HNL West)
Opatija (Inter-county league of Rijeka→Treća HNL West)
Vinogradar (Inter-county league of Center→Treća HNL West)
OŠK Otok (First League of Split-Dalmatia County→Treća HNL South)
Primorac B/M (First League of Zadar county→Treća HNL South)

Groups

East

Stadia and locations

League table

Results

South

Stadia and locations

League table

Results

West

Stadia and locations

League table

Results

See also
2015–16 Croatian First Football League
2015–16 Croatian Second Football League
2015–16 Croatian Football Cup

References

External links
Croatian Football Federation

3
Croatia
Second Football League (Croatia)